Curtarolo is a comune (municipality) in the Province of Padua in the Italian region Veneto, located about  west of Venice and about  north of Padua.

Curtarolo borders the following municipalities: Campo San Martino, Limena, Piazzola sul Brenta, San Giorgio delle Pertiche, Vigodarzere.

References

External links
 Official website

Cities and towns in Veneto